Ricardo Schiesari Barreto Cruz (born January 12, 1982) is a Brazilian singer-songwriter and journalist known for his performances of anime theme songs in Brazil as well being a semi-regular member of the Anison band JAM Project. He regularly tours with the band whenever they visit Latin America, and is also featured on several of the group's singles beginning with the B-side of 2005's "Meikyū no Prisoner".

Early life 

In the mid-1990s to early 2000s, Cruz worked as a musician in Brazil, his native homeland. He also worked as a journal writer, typically translating from Japanese to Portuguese and English. He speaks Portuguese and Japanese fluently. In 2003, he met JAM Project's current leader, Hironobu Kageyama, at the largest anime convention in Brazil, Anime Friends. Kageyama expressed interest in Ricardo's voice, and gave him a demo. The demo track later won him a position in JAM Project as a secondary member.

Career 

Ricardo participated in-studio with JAM Project for the first time in 2005, starting with "Neppu Cybuster Shippu!". In 2006, he performed as part of the group with the original leader Ichirou Mizuki on another single, "Stormbringer". Shortly after in 2007, he shared the stage for the first time in the group's fourth live concert, JAM Project JAPAN CIRCUIT 2007 Break-Out.

He wrote the lyrics for the song "Sempre Sonhando ~Yume Oibito~" on JAM Project's 6th best album in 2006, Get over the Border. In 2009 he collaborated with Kouji Wada to produce a song in Japanese and Portuguese. On September 17, 2010, Ricardo joined up with JAM Project once more for their Reunion concert, where the original members sang with the current members.

Ricardo returned to work with JAM Project in Japan in late 2011 and early 2012 for their Go! Go! GOING!! world tour. He wrote the track "Cross World" on Hironobu Kageyama's 2012 album Rock Japan. In June 2014 started a YouTube channel called MugenLab where he talks about his trips to Japan and his career. On July 20, he debuted his EP called On the Rocks in 2014 at the annual anime convention Anime Friends. Also in 2014, he and other Brazilian singers created the project called " Cavaleiros in Concert" which is a concert with songs of the anime Saint Seiya performed by Ricardo, Rodrigo Rossi, Larissa Tassi and Edu Falaschi. They took this concert to several cities in Brazil.

In 2019, he composed and sang in JAM Project's opening theme for the second season of One-Punch Man. The song is titled "Seijaku no Apostle" (静寂のアポストル, lit. "The Silent Apostle") in Japanese, or "Uncrowned Greatest Hero" internationally. Cruz also appeared in the music video.

Materials

Manga translation works 

 BLEACH:
 Volumes 1-24
 Full Metal Panic
 Naruto:
 Volumes 1-16
 Vampire Knight:
 Volumes 1-2

Solo work 

 Anime Opening set of HunterxHunter (Brazilian Portuguese version)
 Song: Bom Dia (Ohayo)
 OVA's opening set of Saint Seiya: The Hades Chapter - Inferno (Brazilian Portuguese version)
 Song: Megami no Senshi ~ Pegasus Forever ~
 Anime Opening Saint Seiya Omega (Brazilian Portuguese Version)
 Song : Nova Geração (Next Generation) with Edu Falaschi, Rodrigo Rossi and Larissa Tassi
 Anime Opening set of Saint Seiya: Soul of Gold (Brazilian Portuguese version)
 Song : Soldier Dream v2 with Rodrigo Rossi and Larissa Tassi
 Anime Ending set of Dragon Ball Super (Brazilian Portuguese version)
 Song : Chaohan Music (ED 6)
 Song : Haruka (ED 9)

Discography

Solo work

EP 
 "On the rocks" (2014)

Singles 
 "Invasion zone" (2020)

Danger3

Singles 
 "Neo Tokyo" (2017)

Participations

Aquaria 
 Album: Shambala
Song: Neo (feat. Hironobu Kageyama)

Koji Wada 
 Album: Kazakami no oka kara
Song: SEM BARREIRAS ~Kegarenaki Jidai he~ feat. Ricardo Cruz

Hironobu Kageyama 
 Album: ROCK JAPAN
Song: CROSS WORLD ~Oretachi no frontier spirit~ (Composición)

Comitiva do Rock 
Song: Dia de Anime!

JAM Project

Albums 
 Olympia ~JAM Project BEST COLLECTION IV~
 Big Bang ~JAM Project BEST COLLECTION V~
 Get over the Border ~JAM Project BEST COLLECTION VI~
 SEVENTH EXPLOSION ~JAM Project BEST COLLECTION VII~

Singles 
 [22.06.2005] Meikyuu no Prisoner
 [27.04.2007] STORMBRINGER
 [27.05.2009] Rescue fire
 [05.08.2009] Shugoshin - The guardian
 [11.11.2009] Bakuchin Kanryou! Rescue Fire
 [21.04.2010] Transformers EVO
 [25.01.2012] Waga na wa Garo (Voz y Composición)
 [10.07.2013] Mirai he no Chikai
 [02.07.2014] Mirai he no Daikoukai - Great Voyage
 [22.02.2015] Kessen - The Final Round

DVD concerts 
 JAM Project JAPAN CIRCUIT 2007 Break Out
 JAM Project JAPAN FLIGHT 2008 No Border
 JAM Project Hurricane Tour 2009 ~Gate of the Future~

Anime OSTs 
 Tari Tari [26.09.2012]
 "Amigo! Amigo!" (as "Condor Queens" feat. Eduardo Costa & Rafael Ryuji)

References

1982 births
Living people
21st-century Brazilian male singers
21st-century Brazilian singers
Anime musicians
Singers from São Paulo
JAM Project members
Japanese-language singers of Brazil